Nogometni klub Široki Brijeg is a professional association football club from the city of Široki Brijeg, that is situated in Bosnia and Herzegovina.

Currently, Široki Brijeg plays in the Premier League of Bosnia and Herzegovina and plays its home matches on Pecara Stadium which a capacity of 7,000 seats. The club also has a fully equipped sports and recreational center outside the town which is used as training grounds for the team.

History

The club was founded in 1948 as Nogometni klub Borak and competed in local leagues. Until 1991, it competed in the Yugoslav league system under the name of NK Mladost Lištica.

The club was renamed several times until 1995 when it got its present-day name. Široki Brijeg experienced its greatest successes in the 1990s and onwards. The club has won the, now defunct, First League of Herzeg-Bosnia five times and is the most successful club of the competition. Since 2000, Široki Brijeg plays in the Premier League of Bosnia and Herzegovina, the country's top division, which they won two times, as well as three Bosnia and Herzegovina Football Cups.

Since 2002, the club has also, almost non stop been present in many UEFA competitions, most notably the UEFA Champions League and UEFA Europa League. However, Široki Brijeg still hasn't competed in the group stages of both mentioned competitions.

Colours and badge

The club wears blue and white striped jerseys at home while away the team has a white kit. The club's crest features a football bordered by the club's name and topped with the Croatian chequy.

Fans

Škripari is the organisation of football supporters of the Croat-backed club NK Široki Brijeg. They also support Široki Brijeg's other sport clubs, primarily HKK Široki in basketball.

Some ultras  espouse nationalist and right-wing sentiments.

Players

Current squad

Players with multiple nationalities

  Branimir Barišić
  Renato Josipović
  Daniel Lukić
  Juraj Ljubić
  Ilan Pejić
  Dominik Radić
  Tomislav Tomić

Out on loan

Coaching staff

Honours
Široki Brijeg has so far won two Premier League of Bosnia and Herzegovina titles as well as five First League of Herzeg-Bosnia championships that served as the top football league for Croat clubs in Bosnia and Herzegovina until the merger into the Premier League in 2000. The club has also won three Bosnia and Herzegovina Football Cup titles, the most recent one being in the 2016–17 season.

Domestic

League
Premier League of Bosnia and Herzegovina:
 Winners (2): 2003–04, 2005–06
Runners-up (5): 2001–02, 2007–08, 2009–10, 2011–12, 2013–14
First League of Herzeg-Bosnia:
 Winners (5): 1993–94, 1994–95, 1995–96, 1996–97, 1997–98
Runners-up (1): 1998–99

Cups
Bosnia and Herzegovina Cup:
 Winners (3): 2006–07, 2012–13, 2016–17
Runners-up (5): 2004–05, 2005–06, 2011–12, 2014–15, 2018–19
Herzeg-Bosnia Cup:
Runners-up (3): 1995–96, 1997–98, 1998–99

European record

Summary

Source:, Last updated on 15 July 2021.Pld = Matches played; W = Matches won; D = Matches drawn; L = Matches lost; GF = Goals for; GA = Goals against

By result

Last updated: 15 July 2021.

By season

Club ranking

UEFA coefficient

2020–21 season

As of 17 December 2020. Source

Notable managers

References

External links
Official website 
NK Široki Brijeg at UEFA

 
Association football clubs established in 1948
Football clubs in Bosnia and Herzegovina
Croatian football clubs in Bosnia and Herzegovina
1948 establishments in Bosnia and Herzegovina